Panyushkin (Russian: Панюшкин) is a gender-neutral Russian surname. Notable people with the surname include:

Aleksandr Panyushkin (1905–1974), Soviet ambassador to the United States 
Valery Panyushkin (born 1969), Russian journalist and writer

Russian-language surnames